"What Happens in a Small Town" is a song recorded by American country rock artist Brantley Gilbert and Canadian country music artist Lindsay Ell. It is the first single from Gilbert's 2019 album Fire & Brimstone.

History
Gilbert said that he wrote a song and presented it to Scott Borchetta, the president of his label, but was uncertain of its potential as a hit single. As a result, he contacted Rhett Akins and co-writers Brock Berryhill and Josh Dunne, saying that they wanted an "uptempo feel-good radio song". As they wanted the song to be a duet with a female artist, Gilbert asked Borchetta for recommendations, and he suggested Lindsay Ell.

Charts

Weekly charts

Year-end charts

Certifications

References

2019 songs
2019 singles
Brantley Gilbert songs
Lindsay Ell songs
Male–female vocal duets
Big Machine Records singles
Songs written by Brantley Gilbert
Songs written by Rhett Akins
Song recordings produced by Dann Huff
Songs written by Brock Berryhill